Jimmy Connors was the defending champion, but lost in the third round this year.

Ilie Năstase won the men's singles title at the 1973 Queen's Club Championships tennis tournament, defeating Roger Taylor 9–8, 6–3 in the final.

Seeds

  Ilie Năstase (champion)

Draw

Finals

Top half

Section 1

Section 2

Bottom half

Section 3

Section 4

External links
 Main draw

1973 Queen's Club Championships